Carenum punctipenne is a species of ground beetle in the subfamily Scaritinae, found in Australia. It was described by William John Macleay in 1883.

References

punctipenne
Beetles described in 1883